Narcotics Manufacturing Act of 1960 is a federal declaration affirming the United States commitment to international convention protocols constricting the non-medical and non-scientific manufacturing of narcotic drugs. The Act of Congress recognizes the Convention for Limiting the Manufacture and Regulating the Distribution of Narcotic Drugs and 1948 Protocol establishing deterrents for the chemical synthesis and dispensation of illicit drugs. The public law exemplifies a scientific class of narcotic drugs produced from the natural product of the coca leaf and opium poppy.

Provisions of the Act
The codified law was drafted as twenty-two sections providing administrative jurisdiction for basic scientific class of opiates and opioids.

21 U.S.C. §§ 501-502
 Short Title
 Necessity for Legislation
 Definitions

26 U.S.C. §§ 4702 & 4731
 Amendments to Internal Revenue Code of 1954

21 U.S.C. §§ 503-512
 Notifications, Findings, and Decisions under The 1948 Protocol
 Modification of List of Basic Narcotic Drugs
 Restrictions on the Manufacture of Narcotic Drugs
 Licenses to Manufacture Narcotic Drugs
 Revocation or Suspension of Licenses
 Authority to Seize Narcotic Drugs, Order Forms, and Tax Stamps
 Manufacturing Quotas for Basic Classes of Narcotic Drugs
 Exception from Applicability of License and Quota Provisions
 Regulation with Respect to Persons who Manufacture Narcotic Precursors
 Certain Procedures for Judicial Review

21 U.S.C. §§ 513-517
 Amendment to Law with Respect to Exportation of Narcotic Drugs
 Authorizing Importation of Narcotic Drugs as to Certain Persons
 Enforcement and Authority to Delegate Functions
 Penal Provisions
 Procedure and Presumptions
 Applicability of Act

21 U.S.C. § 501
 Separability of Invalid Provisions
 Effective Date

Repeal of Narcotics Manufacturing Act
The 1960 United States public law was repealed by the enactment of Comprehensive Drug Abuse Prevention and Control Act on October 27, 1970.

See also
1946 Lake Success Protocol
Narcotic Drugs Import and Export Act
Narcotic Farms Act of 1929
Single Convention on Narcotic Drugs

References

External links
 
 
 
 

1960 in law
1960 in the United States
86th United States Congress
Drug policy of the United States
History of drug control